Abarca may refer to: 

Abarca (surname)
Abarca (shoe), a type of shoe from the Balearic Islands
Abarca, Melipilla, a village in Melipilla Province, Chile
Abarca, Talca, a village in Talca Province, Chile